Milind Naik may refer to:

 Milind Naik (politician), Indian politician from the state of Goa
 Milind Naik (surgeon) (born 1974), Indian oculoplastic surgeon